39 Draconis is a wide binary star system in the northern circumpolar constellation of Draco. It has the Bayer designation b Draconis, while 39 Draconis is the Flamsteed designation. This system is visible to the naked eye as a dim, white-hued point of light with an apparent visual magnitude of 5.0. Parallax measurements made by the Hipparcos spacecraft put it at a distance of 184 light-years, or 56 parsecs away from the Sun. The system is moving closer to the Earth with a heliocentric radial velocity of -24.5 km/s.

The primary star is an early A-type main-sequence star, having 2.12 times the mass of the Sun with a visual magnitude of 5.06 The secondary is a magnitude 8.07 F-type main-sequence star, and has 1.18 times the mass of the Sun.

It is itself a spectroscopic binary with an F8 primary and a red dwarf secondary orbiting every 2.7 days.

References

A-type main-sequence stars
F-type main-sequence stars
Binary stars

Draco (constellation)
Draconis, 39
Durchmusterung objects
Draconis, b
170073
090156
6923